Agyneta yukona is a species of sheet weaver found in Canada. It was described by Duperre in 2013.

References

yukona
Spiders of Canada
Spiders described in 2013